Jing Dianying (Chinese: 敬奠瀛, 1890–1957) was the founder of the Jesus Family, a major Chinese Pentecostal church movement.

Further reading
Jing Dianying - Ricci Roundtable on the History of Christianity in China
An Autobiography of Jing Dianying, Tai Mountain District Archive, Taian, Shandong, f.147
An Account in Jing Dianying's own words, Tai Archive, f.47

1890 births
1957 deaths
Chinese Pentecostals